Federal Agents vs. Underworld, Inc. (1949) is a 12-episode black-and-white film serial produced by Republic Pictures during July 1948 and released in January 1949, an original screenplay written collaboratively by Royal K. Cole, Basil Dickey, William Lively and Sol Shor as a crime story with elements of "the mysterious Orient" incorporated in the plot.

Plot
Nila (Carol Forman), an Abistahnian criminal, and Spade Gordon (Roy Barcroft), an American gangster, conspire to form a super-mob dubbed Underworld, Incorporated, funded by the treasure of Kurigal I of Abistahn, instructions for the location of which are contained in hieroglyphics written on two golden statues in the shape of hands, found in Kurigal's tomb.  When the professor in charge of the tomb's dig disappears under mysterious circumstances while translating the writing on one of the hands back at his American office, a team of special government agents led by David Worth (Kirk Alyn) and his aide Steve Evans, assisted by the professor's aide Laura Keith (Rosemary La Planche), set out to find the professor and the now-missing hands. The criminals manage to get possession of one of the Hands, but they need both of them to recreate the treasure map.

Cast
 Kirk Alyn as Inspector David Worth
 Rosemary LaPlanche as Laura Keith
 Roy Barcroft as Spade Gordon
 Carol Forman as Nila
 James Dale as Agent Steve Evans
 Bruce Edwards as Prof Paul Williams
 James Craven as Prof James Clayton
 Tristram Coffin as Frank Chambers

Production
Federal Agents vs. Underworld, Inc. was budgeted at $156,120 although the final negative cost was $155,807 (a $313, or 0.2%, under spend).  It was the cheapest Republic serial of 1949.

It was filmed between 6 July and 27 July 1948 under the working title Crime Fighters vs. Underworld, Inc.  The serial's production number was 1701.

Stunts
Tom Steele as Inspector David Worth/Spade Gordon/Frank Chambers (doubling Kirk Alyn, Roy Barcroft & Tristram Coffin)
Dale Van Sickel as Inspector David Worth/Prof Paul Williams (doubling Kirk Alyn & Bruce Edwards)
John Daheim as Agent Steve Evans (doubling James Dale)

Special Effects
The special effects in this serial were created by the Howard & Theodore Lydecker, Republic's in-house effect team.

Release

Theatrical
Federal Agents vs. Underworld, Inc.'''s official release date is January 29, 1949, although this is actually the date the sixth chapter was made available to film exchanges.

TelevisionFederal Agents vs. Underworld, Inc. was one of twenty-six Republic serials re-released as a film on television in 1966.  The title of the film was changed to Golden Hands of Kurigal.  This version was cut down to 100-minutes in length.

Chapter titlesThirteen minutes and 20 seconds long, unless otherwise specified
 The Golden Hands (20 minutes)
 Criminals' Lair
 Death in Disguise
 Fatal Evidence
 The Trapped Conspirator
 Wheels of Disaster
 The Hidden Key
 The Enemy's Mouthpiece
 The Stolen Hand
 Unmasked - a re-cap chapter
 Tombs of the Ancients
 The Curse of Kurigal
Source:

See also
 List of film serials by year
 List of film serials by studio

References

External links

1949 films
1949 crime films
American black-and-white films
1940s English-language films
Republic Pictures film serials
Films directed by Fred C. Brannon
Treasure hunt films
Films set in a fictional country
American crime films
1940s American films